CCCM can stand for:

Corpus Christianorum Continuatio Mediaevalis
Macau Science and Culture Centre (Centro Científico e Cultural de Macau)
Certified Commercial Contracts Manager  (see National Contract Management Association)
Climate change counter-movement